Ylva Hedlund (later Langermo; born 22 November 1949) is a Swedish speed skater. She competed at the 1968 and the 1972 Winter Olympics with the best result of 14th place over 1000 m in 1972.

Her father Göthe Hedlund was an Olympic medalist in speed skating.

References

External links
 

1949 births
Living people
Swedish female speed skaters
Olympic speed skaters of Sweden
Speed skaters at the 1968 Winter Olympics
Speed skaters at the 1972 Winter Olympics
Sportspeople from Stockholm